The 2022 Boar's Head Resort Women's Open was a professional tennis tournament played on outdoor clay courts. It was the twentieth edition of the tournament which was part of the 2022 ITF Women's World Tennis Tour. It took place in Charlottesville, Virginia, United States between 18 and 24 April 2022.

Singles main draw entrants

Seeds

 1 Rankings are as of 11 April 2022.

Other entrants
The following players received wildcards into the singles main draw:
  Elizabeth Mandlik
  Whitney Osuigwe
  Taylor Townsend
  Sachia Vickery

The following players received entry from the qualifying draw:
  Cadence Brace
  Kayla Day
  Ellie Douglas
  Jasmin Jebawy
  Gabriela Lee
  Rasheeda McAdoo
  Tara Moore
  Sofia Shapatava

Champions

Singles

  Louisa Chirico def.  Wang Xiyu, 6–4, 6–3

Doubles

  Sophie Chang /  Angela Kulikov def.  Valentini Grammatikopoulou /  Alycia Parks, 2–6, 6–3, [10–4]

References

External links
 2022 Boar's Head Resort Women's Open at ITFtennis.com
 Official website

2022 ITF Women's World Tennis Tour
2022 in American tennis
April 2022 sports events in the United States